The Bradford Bulls are a professional rugby league club in Bradford, West Yorkshire, England, playing in the Championship. They have won five Challenge Cups, nine league championships and three World Club Challenges. The team jersey is predominantly white with red, amber and black chevrons.

In 1907, Bradford F.C., founder member of the Rugby Football League, switched codes to association football and Bradford Northern, often abbreviated to Northern, was formed by members who wished to continue rugby. Bradford Northern were renamed Bradford Bulls in 1996, at the start of Super League. Bradford's main rivalries are with Leeds, Halifax and Huddersfield.

The club entered administration in 2012, and again in 2014 and 2016. Several bids were made to take over the club but none were accepted by the administrators, and so on 3 January 2017 the club went into liquidation. Immediately the RFL announced the criteria and invited bids to form a "new club", which ultimately acted as an immediate resurrection of the Bulls which retained the history, club colours, badge, home stadium and several players from the 2016 squad. Due to the administration and liquidation, the club started the 2017 season with a 12-point deduction. With a few games left of the 2017 season, Bradford's relegation fears were confirmed and in 2018 they played in League One earning promotion back to the Championship after beating Workington Town on 7 October 2018.

History

1863–1907: Bradford F.C.

The original Bradford Football Club was formed in 1863 and played rugby football, subsequently joining the Rugby Football Union. Initially the club played at Horton Cricket Ground, All Saints Road but were asked to leave because of damage to the pitch. They then moved to Laisteridge Lane and later North Park Road in Manningham. A nomadic existence continued as they then went on to Peel Park, then Girlington and Apperley Bridge.

Bradford Football Club and Bradford Cricket Club bought Park Avenue in 1879 and this resulted in the club becoming "Bradford Cricket, Athletic and Football Club". The club's headquarters were at the Talbot Darley Street, and later The Alexandra, Great Horton Road. The club achieved its first major success by winning the Yorkshire Cup in 1884.

After the 1890–91 season, Bradford along with other Yorkshire Senior clubs Batley, Brighouse, Dewsbury, Halifax, Huddersfield, Hull, Hunslet, Leeds, Liversedge, Manningham and Wakefield decided that they wanted their own county league starting in 1891 along the lines of a similar competition that had been played in Lancashire. The clubs wanted full control of the league but the Yorkshire Rugby Football Union would not sanction the competition as it meant giving up control of rugby football to the senior clubs.

In 1895, along with cross-town neighbours Manningham F.C., Bradford was among 22 clubs to secede from the Rugby Football Union after the historic meeting at the George Hotel in Huddersfield in response to a dispute over "broken time" payments to players who were thus part-time professionals. These 22 clubs formed the Northern Rugby Football Union (which eventually became the Rugby Football League) and rugby league football was born.

Bradford enjoyed some success in the new competition. In the 1903–04 Northern Rugby Football Union season, the team finished level on points with Salford at the top of the league and then won the resulting play-off 5–0.  In 1905–06, Bradford beat Salford 5–0 to win the Challenge Cup and were runners-up in the Championship. In 1906–07, Bradford won the Yorkshire County Cup 8–5 against Hull Kingston Rovers.

During this time Manningham F.C. had run into financial difficulties and, despite a summer archery contest that generated enough money to ensure their survival, its members were persuaded to swap codes and play association football instead. Manningham was invited to join the Football League in 1903, in an attempt to promote football in a rugby-dominated region, and the newly renamed Bradford City A.F.C. was voted into full membership of the Second Division without having played a game of football, having a complete team or even being able to guarantee a ground. The creation of Bradford City led to demands for association football at Park Avenue too.  The ground had already hosted some football matches including one in the 1880s between Blackburn Rovers and Blackburn Olympic F.C.  In 1895, a Bradford side had beaten a team from Moss Side, Manchester, by 4–1 in front of 3,000 spectators. Following the change at Bradford City, a meeting was called of the Bradford FC members on 15 April 1907 to decide the rugby club's future. An initial vote appeared to favour continuing in rugby league, but then opinion shifted towards rugby union and the chairman, Mr Briggs, used his influence to swing the committee behind the proposed move to association football. This act, sometimes referred to as "The Great Betrayal", led to Bradford FC becoming the Bradford Park Avenue Association Football Club. The minority faction decided to split and form a new club to continue playing in the Northern Union, appropriately called "Bradford Northern", which applied for and was granted Bradford FC's place in the 1907–08 Northern Rugby Football Union season. Bradford Northern's first home ground was the Greenfield Athletic Ground in Dudley Hill, to the south of the city. They based themselves at the Greenfield Hotel.

1907–1963: Bradford Northern
Northern moved to Birch Lane in 1908. Bradford council offered the club a site for a new stadium between Rooley Lane and Mayo Avenue in 1927. However the NRFU said the site was too small and the club kept on looking. Before moving to Odsal, Bradford Northern had had two other homes at Greenfield Athletic Ground in Dudley Hill and at Birch Lane which was part of the Bowling Old Lane cricket ground, although at times they also had to hire Valley Parade as the capacity at Birch Lane was insufficient for large matches.

On 20 June 1933 Bradford Northern signed a ten-year lease with Bradford council for a former quarry being used as a waste dump at Odsal Top. It was turned into the biggest stadium outside Wembley. The Bradford Northern team played its first match there on 1 September 1934.

Success came to Bradford in the 1940s with a number of cup wins: the Yorkshire cup in 1940–41, 1942–43, 1944–45, 1945–46, 1948–49 and 1949–50; and the Challenge Cup 1943–44, 1946–47 and 1948–49. In the Championship Bradford found it difficult to win either before the war or after despite being runners up in 1942–43 and 1947–48. On Saturday 3 November 1945, Bradford Northern met Wakefield Trinity in the final of the Yorkshire Cup held at Thrum Hall, Halifax. Wakefield began the match as favourites, they had lost only one of thirteen matches thus far in the season. However, Bradford won 5–2 Frank Whitcombe scoring the try converted by George Carmichael and lifted the Yorkshire Cup for the fourth time in six seasons.

Bradford defeated Leeds 8–4 to win the Challenge Cup Final at Wembley in 1947. The 1947–48 Challenge Cup final was notable as it was the first rugby league match to be attended by the reigning monarch, King George VI, who presented the trophy. It was also the first televised rugby league match as it was broadcast to the Midlands. Bradford lost 8–3 to Wigan and Frank Whitcombe became the first player to win the Lance Todd trophy on the losing side. The 1949 Challenge Cup final was sold out for first time as 95,050 spectators saw Bradford beat Halifax. In 1951–52 Bradford were runners up in the league but beat New Zealand at Odsal in the first floodlit football match of any code in the North of England.

In 1953, a crowd of 69,429 watched Bradford play Huddersfield in the Challenge Cup's third round. This was Bradford's highest ever attendance. They also won the Yorkshire Cup final 7–2 against Hull. Bradford and Leigh were the first rugby league clubs to stage matches on a Sunday in December 1954, although there was opposition from the Sunday Observance lobby.

Bradford's support declined rapidly in the 1963 season, attracting a record low crowd of 324 against Barrow. The club went out of business on 10 December 1963, having played just 13 matches; winning 1 and losing 12, scoring 109 points and conceding 284, the results were declared null and void, and expunged from the 1963–64 season's records.

1964–1995: Third club
A meeting on 14 April 1964 saw 1,500 people turn out to discuss the formation of a new club, and those present promised a £1000 to help get plans for the new organisation underway. Amongst those who led proceedings were former players Joe Phillips and Trevor Foster. On 20 July 1964, Bradford Northern (1964) Ltd came into existence. The club's new side had been built for around £15,000 and had Jack Wilkinson as coach. On 22 August 1964, Hull Kingston Rovers provided the opposition in the reformed club's first match and 14,500 spectators turned out to show their support, as Odsal hosted its first 10,000 plus gate for a Bradford Northern match since 1957.

The reformed club won its first cup in 1965–66 by beating Hunslet 17–8 in the final of the Yorkshire County Cup. In 1972–73 Bradford lost the Challenge Cup final against Featherstone Rovers 33–14. In 1973–74 Bradford won the Second Division Championship and were promoted back to the First Division. During this season Keith Mumby made his début, becoming the Bradford's youngest player at only 16 years of age, kicking 12 goals and scoring a try in the match against Doncaster. He went on to make a record 576 appearances for the club. In 1974–75 Bradford won the Regal Trophy 3–2 against Widnes.

Peter Fox joined Bradford as coach for the first time in 1977–78. Bradford won the Premiership final 17–8 against Widnes and were also Championship runners-up.

In 1978–79 Bradford appeared in another Premiership final this time losing 24–2 to Leeds. A year later Bradford won the Championship and Regal Trophy, Peter Fox winning the award for Coach of the Year. In 1980–81 the club made it back-to-back championships. In 1981–82, Bradford lost the Yorkshire Cup final 10–5 against Castleford and lost again in 1982–83, this time 18–7 against Hull F.C. Keith Mumby won the award for First Division Player of the Year while Brian Noble won the Young Player award.

In 1985, Ellery Hanley left Northern to join Wigan for a then record transfer deal, worth £80,000 and a player exchange involving Steve Donlan and Phil Ford. By November 1987, Bradford had cash-flow problems and the local council refused to help financially, but appointed a special committee to administer the clubs' finances. In December 1987, desperate for cash, Bradford transfer-listed 22 players for a total of £210,000 plus Phil Ford for £120,000.

In 1987–88 Bradford won the Yorkshire Cup final replay against Castleford 11–2 after drawing 12–12. Ron Willey coached Bradford Northern for a short stint in 1989–90 and led them to the Premiership final and success in the Yorkshire Cup final when they beat Featherstone Rovers 20–14.

David Hobbs became coach at Northern in 1990 until he left for Wakefield Trinity in 1994. Bradford lost the Regal Trophy against Warrington 12–2 in 1990–91. Peter Fox returned to Bradford for a second spell as coach in 1991, and in 1993–94, Bradford finished as runners-up behind Wigan on points difference. Fox left the club in 1995.

1996–2011: Golden era
In 1996, the first tier of English rugby league clubs changed from a winter to a summer season and played the inaugural Super League season. Bradford dropped the 'Northern' name to become Bradford Bulls. Matthew Elliot took over as head coach in 1996. The Bulls won the Super League title in his first season.

Elliot coached the Bradford Bulls to the 1999 Super League Grand Final which was lost to St Helens.

Brian Noble was appointed Bradford head coach in November 2000. Noble took the Bradford Bulls to the 2001 Super League Grand Final in which they defeated the Wigan Warriors. As Super League VI champions, the Bulls played against 2001 NRL Premiers, the Newcastle Knights in the 2002 World Club Challenge. Noble oversaw Bradford's victory. He took the Bulls to the 2002 Super League Grand Final which was lost to St. Helens.

On 20 April 2006, Steve McNamara was promoted to head coach of Bradford following Brian Noble's departure to Wigan. At the time he was the youngest coach in Britain. In his first season in charge, he guided Bradford to the Super League play-offs before the club were knocked out in the grand final eliminator by Hull

Following an eighth consecutive defeat, the Bulls' worst run in Super League, McNamara's contract was mutually terminated on 13 July 2010. Lee St Hilaire was coach for the rest of the 2010 season.

Mick Potter became coach in 2011. Despite the club being placed in receivership in 2012, the team was on the verge of making the semi-finals of Super League as Potter remained as unpaid coach.

2012–2017: Administrations, relegation and liquidation
In March 2012 the club announced that it was in financial difficulties and needed £1 million to keep the club afloat. A public appeal saw a lot of new funds pour in from supporters, but following the issue of a winding up petition from HMRC for unpaid taxes the holding company for the club was forced to go into administration on 26 June 2012. The Rugby Football League announced that had the company been wound up then the team would be allowed to complete their fixtures for the 2012 Super League season under the possible ownership of a supporters trust. On 2 July 2012, the club's administrator, Brendan Guilfoyle, made sixteen members of staff, including the coach Mick Potter and chief executive Ryan Duckett, redundant, but announced that the club would attempt to fulfill its fixtures. Mick Potter continued as an unpaid coach until the end of the season. On 31 August 2012 a bid for the club from a local consortium, headed by Bradford businessman Omar Khan, was accepted by the administrator and was ratified by the RFL in early September. Days later the RFL also granted the new owners a one-year probationary licence enabling the club to compete in Super League XVIII in 2013.

Francis Cummins was appointed as head coach of the Bulls in September 2012.
During the 2012/13 season the Bulls appointed Dr Allan Johnston to the backroom staff to support the players wellbeing and performance. This appointment was thought to be the first of its kind in Rugby League.
In late December 2013 it was announced that chairman Mark Moore and directors Ian Watt and Andrew Calvert had resigned.

In 2014, relegation was reintroduced to the Super League with two teams being relegated. Bradford were deducted 6 points for entering administration early on in the season and the Bulls were relegated from the top division of rugby league in Britain for the first time in 40 years. Francis Cummins was sacked around the time of relegation and replaced by James Lowes and won most of their remaining games.

Bradford began their first Championship campaign in 40 years against Leigh away where they narrowly lost the game. By the end of the regular season they entered the Super 8s finishing second. In the Qualifiers Bradford failed to make the top three for automatic entry to Super League for 2016, finishing 5th which meant a trip to Wakefield to play them in the first ever Million Pound Game. Bradford would lose 24–16, condemning them to a second year in the Championship.

In preparation for the 2016 season, Bradford completed the signings of several experienced players, such as Centre Kris Welham from Super League side Hull Kingston Rovers, as well as Oscar Thomas, Mitch Clark, Johnny Campbell, Jonathan Walker and Kurt Haggerty from London Broncos, Doncaster, Batley and Leigh. Bradford started the season strongly, with a win over fellow promotion hopefuls Featherstone Rovers by 22–12. Omari Caro scored a hat-trick in this match. This was followed up by away wins at Whitehaven and Swinton. Bradford's season was ultimately disappointing with failure to reach the Qualifiers, this meant Bradford would miss out on a chance of promotion

On 14 November 2016, Bradford Bulls were placed in administration for the third time since 2012. On 16 November, the Rugby Football League (RFL) cancelled Bradford's membership, making their future uncertain.  In the ensuing weeks several bids to buy the club were made but despite one bid being acceptable to the RFL, none were accepted by the administrator and the club went into liquidation on 3 January 2017.

Following liquidation the RFL issued a statement saying:

2017–2019: Fourth club
After the Bulls went into liquidation in January 2017 the Rugby Football League invited bids to form a new club based in Bradford who would be allowed to take the place of the Bulls in the 2017 Championship but started with a 12-point penalty deduction.

The RFL issued a set of criteria for anyone wishing to bid for the new club and there were 12 expressions of interest of which four were converted into bids submitted to the RFL.  On 13 January the RFL announced that a consortium to run the new club had been selected an notified of the decision.  The new owner was publicly announced on 17 January as Andrew Chalmers, the former chairman of the New Zealand Rugby League.  Also involved is former player and coach, Graham Lowe.

The parent company of the club is registered as Bradford Bulls 2017 Limited at Companies House, and the team continue to be known as Bradford Bulls, also retaining the club colours, stadium and several players from the 2016 squad. On 20 January 2017 Geoff Toovey was named as coach and Leon Pryce as captain. However, a delay in processing his paperwork left Toovey unable to fulfil his role and led to Leigh Beattie being appointed as interim coach.

Before the start of the 2018 season, the Bulls appointed the highly experienced John Kear as coach, and under his guidance, gained promotion to the Championship.

2019–present: Move to Dewsbury and Return to Odsal
In August 2019, Bulls chairman Andrew Chalmers announced that the club could no longer afford to play at Odsal and were to relocate to Dewsbury for two years after the preferred alternatives, Valley Parade and Horsfall Stadium were deemed too expensive. On 1 September 2019, Bradford Bulls played the last game at Odsal stadium for the next year and a half, and bade a temporary farewell to the 85-year-old home ground for the team.
In November 2019, Nigel Wood, Mark Sawyer, and Eric Perez took over the ownership of the club, although Perez's involvement would only be temporary, as interim chair for a few months.
The Bulls returned to Odsal in May 2021. In the 2022 RFL Championship season, Bradford finished a disappointing 9th on the table.

Stadiums

1907–1933: Greenfield and Birch Lane

The Bradford Northern club had played at a number of venues including the Greenfield Athletic Ground in Dudley Hill and Bowling Old Lane Cricket Club's ground in Birch Lane. By the early 1920s, however, Birch Lane's limitations were clear and Northern began to seek another home. Precarious finances prevented the club being able to take up an offer to develop land off Rooley Lane or to upgrade and move back to Greenfield, but in 1933, Bradford City Council gave them the opportunity to transform land at Odsal Top into their home ground.

1934–Present: Odsal

Odsal Stadium has been the home ground of Bradford Northern/Bulls since 1934. Odsal had also hosted many other sports, including association football, speedway, stock car racing, basketball, featuring the Harlem Globetrotters, wrestling, show jumping and kabaddi. The stadium's largest attendances was 102,569, when Halifax played Warrington on 5 May 1954 in the Challenge Cup Final replay.

The few home matches played during the abandoned 2020 season and three home matches of the 2021 season were played at Dewsbury's Crown Flatt ground as Odsal Stadium was a financial struggle at £450,000 rent per year. Bradford returned to Odsal during the 2021 season.

Crest and colours

Crest
Up until the Super League era the club was known as Bradford Northern and used a stylised boar's head similar to the one atop the Bradford city coat of arms. When the club was rebranded Bradford Bulls the crest was changed to a similar design to that of the Chicago Bulls.

Colours
Bradford's traditional playing colours are a red, amber and black hoop, on a white background. Bradford's home strips are predominantly white with a red, amber and black hoop or "V".  Away strips have had many designs and colours, but usually integrate the traditional red, amber and black into the design.

Kit sponsors and manufacturers

Rivalries

Bradford's main rivals are Leeds Rhinos who they have played in multiple finals, especially during the early years of Super League as well as St Helens whom they faced in two successive Challenge cup finals during the golden era. They also have a lesser local rivalry with Keighley Cougars although this was considered a one-way rivalry and competitive fixtures were rare as they played in different divisions. They also have other local rivalries with Halifax Panthers and Huddersfield Giants.

2023 squad

2023 transfers

Gains

Losses

Players

Notable former players

Harry Sunderland Trophy winners
The Harry Sunderland Trophy is awarded to the Man-of-the-Match in the Super League Grand Final by the Rugby League Writers' Association.

Lance Todd Trophy winners
The Lance Todd Trophy is awarded to the Man-of-the-Match in the Challenge Cup Final. Introduced in 1946, the trophy was named in memory of Lance Todd, the New Zealand-born player and administrator, who was killed in a road accident during the Second World War.

Steve Prescott Man of Steel winners
The Steve Prescott Man of Steel Award is an annual honour, awarded by the Super League to the most outstanding player in the British game for that year.

Treble winning team

This list contains the players who played in the Challenge Cup, Grand Final.

Captains
From 1996 -
Robbie Paul 1996–04
Jamie Peacock 2005
Iestyn Harris 2006
Paul Deacon 2007–09
Andy Lynch 2010–11
Heath L'Estrange 2012–13
Matt Diskin 2012–14
Chev Walker 2015
Adrian Purtell 2016
Leon Pryce 2017
Sam Hallas/Scott Moore 2017
Lee Smith 2018
Steve Crossley 2018–present

Staff

Past coaches
Also see :Category:Bradford Bulls coaches

 1936–60 Dai Rees 
 1960–61 Trevor Foster 
 1961 Doug Greenall
 1961–62 Jimmy Ledgard
 1962–63 Harry Beverley
 1963 Jack Wilkinson
 1964–71 Gus Risman
 1971–72 Harry Street
 1973–75 Ian Brooke
 1975 Albert Fearnley
 1975–77 Roy Francis
 1977–85 Peter Fox
 1985–89 Barry Seabourne
 1989 David Hobbs
 1989–90 Ron Willey
 1990–93 David Hobbs
 1993–95 Peter Fox
 1995–96 Brian Smith
 1996–2000 Matthew Elliott
 2001–06 Brian Noble
 2006–10 Steve McNamara
 2010 Lee St Hilaire
 2011–12 Mick Potter
 2013–14 Francis Cummins
 2014 Matt Diskin
 2014–16 James Lowes
 2016–17 Rohan Smith
 2017 Geoff Toovey
 2018–22 John Kear
 2022–present Mark Dunning

Seasons

League history

Super League era

Honours

League
Division 1 / Super League/Wartime Emergency League:
Winners (9): 1939-40, 1940-41, 1944-45, 1979–80, 1980–81, 1997, 2001, 2003, 2005
League Leader's Shield:
Winners (3): 1999, 2001, 2003
Division 2 / Championship:
Winners (1): 1973–74
Championship Shield:
Winners (1): 2016
Division 3 / League 1:

League 1 Play-offs:
Winners (1): 2018
Premiership:
Winners (1): 1977–78
RFL Yorkshire League:
Winners (1): 1947–48

Cups
Challenge Cup:
Winners (5): 1943–44, 1946–47, 1948–49, 2000, 2003
League Cup:
Winners (2): 1974–75, 1979–80
RFL Yorkshire Cup:
Winners (11): 1940–41, 1941–42, 1943–44, 1945–46, 1948–49, 1949–50, 1953–54, 1965–66, 1978–79, 1987–88, 1989–90

International
World Club Challenge:
Winners (3): 2002, 2004, 2006

Records

Club Records
Biggest win: 
124-0 v.  West Wales (at Odsal, 6 May 2018)
Biggest loss: 
6-84  v.  Wigan (at DW Stadium, 21 April 2014)

Highest Super League attendance: 
24,020 v.  Leeds (at Odsal, 3 September 1999)

See also
Bradford Bulls Women
Bradford Bulls Academy

Notes

References

Bibliography

External links
 
Bradford Bulls in T&A
Sky Sports Rugby League
RFL Championship and League One
BBC Rugby League

 
English rugby league teams
Rugby clubs established in 1907
1907 establishments in England
Sport in Bradford